Hughbert William "Hugh" Conklin was a college football player.

University of Georgia
He was a prominent end for the Georgia Bulldogs football team of the University of Georgia from 1910 to 1913. Conklin was from Atlanta.

1912
In 1912, Conklin caught the pass from Bob McWhorter to beat Auburn.

1913
He was selected All-Southern in 1913.

References

Georgia Bulldogs football players
All-Southern college football players
American football ends
People from Atlanta
Year of birth missing
Year of death missing
Place of death missing